
Gmina Starogard Gdański is a rural gmina (administrative district) in Starogard County, Pomeranian Voivodeship, in northern Poland. Its seat is the town of Starogard Gdański, although the town is not part of the territory of the gmina.

Villages
Gmina Starogard Gdański contains the villages and settlements of Barchnowy, Brzeźno Wielkie, Ciecholewy, Dąbrówka, Helenowo, Jabłowo, Janin, Janowo, Klonówka, Kochanka, Kokoszkowy, Kolincz, Koteże, Krąg, Kręgski Młyn, Linowiec, Lipinki Szlacheckie, Marywil, Najmusy, Nowa Wieś Rzeczna, Okole, Owidz, Owidz-Młyn, Płaczewo, Rokocin, Rywałd, Siwiałka, Stary Las, Sucumin, Sumin, Szpęgawsk, Trzcińsk, Żabno, Zduny and Żygowice.

Neighbouring gminas
Gmina Starogard Gdański is bordered by the town of Starogard Gdański and by the gminas of Bobowo, Lubichowo, Pelplin, Skarszewy, Subkowy, Tczew and Zblewo.

References
Polish official population figures 2006

Starogard Gdanski
Starogard County